Pundak, Pundik or Fundik (Hebrew: פונדק) is a Jewish surname that may refer to
Herbert Pundik (or Nahum Pundak, 1927–2019), Danish journalist and author
Jordan Pundik (born 1979), American musician and songwriter
Ron Pundak (1955–2014), Israeli historian and journalist
Yitzhak Pundak (1913–2017), Israeli general, diplomat and politician

Hebrew-language surnames